Haochen Zhang (pinyin: zhāng hàochén) (born June 3, 1990) is a Chinese pianist from Shanghai, China.
He was a Gold Medalist and First Prize winner of the Thirteenth Van Cliburn International Piano Competition in 2009, becoming one of the youngest winners in the history of the competition. Zhang received a 2017 Avery Fisher Career Grant in recognition of his outstanding talents.

Early life

Zhang began studying piano at three and a half and gave his debut recital at the Shanghai Music Hall at the age of five, performing Haydn and Mozart sonatas, in addition to all 15 of Bach’s two-part inventions. By six, he gave his orchestral debut playing Mozart’s Piano Concerto K. 467 with the Shanghai Symphony Orchestra. He was awarded first prize at the Shanghai Piano Competition at the age of seven and again at nine. At eleven, Zhang gave tours in all the major cities in China performing Beethoven and Mozart Sonatas and the complete Chopin Etudes Op. 10. At twelve, Zhang won the 4th International Tchaikovsky Competition for Young Musicians, becoming the youngest winner in the history of the competition. In 2004, he made his debut at the 49th International Chopin Festival in Duszniki, Poland, performing the complete Chopin Etudes Op. 25.

In 2005, Zhang moved to the United States to attend the Curtis Institute of Music with a full-tuition scholarship as a Harold and Helene Schonberg Fellow to study under the world-renowned Gary Graffman, who also taught Lang Lang and Yuja Wang. The following year, he made his debut with the Philadelphia Orchestra performing Rachmaninov's Second Piano Concerto.

In October 2007, at just 17 years of age Zhang became the youngest winner of the China International Piano Competition; and in 2008, at the age of 18, he made his Carnegie Hall debut with the New York Youth Symphony performing Mozart's D minor Concerto K.466 and the world premiere of a commissioned work by Ryan Gallagher.

Career

In June 2009, Zhang became the first Chinese competitor to be awarded the Nancy Lee and Perry R. Bass Gold Medal at the Thirteenth Van Cliburn International Piano Competition. As part of his prize package, Zhang received commission-free artist management from the Van Cliburn Foundation for three seasons following the competition. Immediately after winning the Gold Medal, Zhang embarked on an extensive three-year tour across the United States and abroad playing an incredible 200 concerts in the Americas, Asia, and Europe, including solos at distinguished festivals such as Beijing Music Festival and the Gilmore International Keyboard Music Festival.

February 10, 2017 Zhang released his first studio album on BIS Records including Schumann's Kinderszenen, Liszt's Ballade No. 2 in B Minor, Brahms's Three Intermezzi, and Janácek's Piano Sonata 1.X.1905, "From the Street."

He is currently managed by Kanzen Arts and KAJIMOTO.

Notable performances

Zhang has performed with the China National Symphony Orchestra, Krakow State Philharmonic, New Jersey Symphony Orchestra, Philadelphia Orchestra, London Philharmonic Orchestra,  Israel Philharmonic, San Francisco Symphony, Hong Kong Philharmonic,  and the Shanghai Symphony Orchestra, and has played concerts throughout Asia, Europe, and the United States including Aspen Music Festival.

In April 2013, Zhang made his debut in Munich with the Munich Philharmonic and the late maestro Lorin Maazel. In 2014, he made his debut at the BBC Proms with Yu Long and the China Philharmonic playing Liszt's Piano Concerto No. 1.

In October 2017, Zhang replaced Lang Lang, whose arm was injured, in China NCPA's Carnegie Hall debut led by Lü Jia.

In January 2020, Zhang made his debut with the New York Philharmonic in a Lunar New Year concert with Long Yu and he returned for his New York Philharmonic subscription debut with Anna Rakitina in March 2022.

Discography

Awards

Personal life

Zhang is based in Philadelphia. He has interests in many other fields, including history and literature.

References

External links

1990 births
Living people
21st-century Chinese musicians
21st-century classical pianists
21st-century male musicians
Chinese classical pianists
Curtis Institute of Music alumni
Male classical pianists
Musicians from Shanghai
Prize-winners of the Van Cliburn International Piano Competition